Rajcharadi is a village in the Surendranagar district of Gujarat, India. Rajcharadi is surrounded by Lakhtar taluka towards the east, Surendranagar taluka towards the west, Wadhwan taluka to the north and Muli taluka at the south. Rajcharadi's Postal Index Number code is 363320 and the postal head office is Surendranagar.

References 

Villages in Surendranagar district